Ivančević is a Serbian and Croatian surname. Notable people with the surname include:

Andrea Ivančević (born 1984), Croatian athlete
Radmilo Ivančević (born 1950), Serbian footballer and manager
Mihajlo Ivančević (born 1999), Serbian footballer

See also
 Ivančić

Croatian surnames
Serbian surnames